This is a list of entities that have issued postage stamps at some point since stamps were introduced in 1840.  The list includes any kind of governmental entity or officially approved organisation that has issued distinctive types of stamp .  These include post offices in foreign countries and postal services organised by military occupations, international organisations, colonies, provinces, city-states and some revolutionary movements.  The list includes members of the Universal Postal Union that are also listed at postal organisations.

Many of these entities are historic and some were very short-lived indeed.  Philatelists and stamp collectors often refer to the entities that no longer issue stamps as dead countries.

The dates are the generally agreed-upon dates of first and last stamp issues.  "Date of issue" is taken to mean the date when a particular type or variation was  issued but its usage would often continue for many years.  For example, although an entity may have issued its last stamp in 1951, actual usage may have continued until 1960: in that case, 1951 is the last stamp issue date.

Besides the period of which stamps were issued in the name of a particular entity, the list under that entity also bears any other name in which stamps had been issued for territory, name of any other entity which had had its stamps used in that territory, or new names which had subsequently replaced the name of that entity, together with their respective periods.

List
The list has been comprehensively revised to include extra entities and to direct the links away from the country articles to the (proposed) philatelic articles.

Macao/Macau
 Macao, Republica Portuguesa	1884 – 1999
 Macau, China	1999 -

Macedonia
 Macedonia	1991 –

Madagascar and Dependencies
 Anjouan	1892 – 1914
 Diégo-Suarez	1890 – 1896
 Great Comoro	1897 – 1914
 Madagascar and Dependencies	1896 – 1958
 Mayotte	1892 – 1914
 Moheli	1906 – 1914
 Nossi-Bé	1889 – 1891
 Ste Marie de Madagascar	1894 – 1896

Madeira
 Funchal	1892 – 1905
 Madeira	1868 –

Malagasy Republic
 Malagasy Republic	1958 –

Malawi
 British Central Africa	1891 – 1908
 Nyasaland Protectorate	1907 – 1964
 Rhodesia and Nyasaland	1954 – 1964
 Malawi	1964 –

Malaysia
 Straits Settlements	1867 - 1937
 Federated Malay States	1900 – 1935
 Malaya (British Military Administration)	1945 – 1948
 Malayan Federation	1957 – 1963
 Malayan Postal Union	1936 – 1968
 Malaysia	1963 –
 Malaysian States and Territories
 Federal Territory
 Federal Territory (Kuala Lumpur)	1979 – 
 Federal Territory (Putrajaya)	2001 – 
 Labuan
 Straits Settlements
 Labuan	1879 - 1894
 North Borneo (Labuan overprint)	1894 - 1907
 Johore	1876 –
 Kedah	1912 –
 Kelantan	1911 –
 Malacca
 India	1854 - 1867
 Straits Settlements	1867 - 1937
 Malacca	1948 –
 Negri Sembilan
 Sungei Ujong	1878 – 1895
 Negri Sembilan	1891 –
 Pahang	1889 –
 Penang
 India	1854 - 1867
 Straits Settlements	1867 - 1937
 Penang	1948 –
 Perak	1878 –
 Perlis	1948 –
 Sabah
 North Borneo (British North Borneo)	1883 – 1894
 North Borneo	(State of North Borneo) 1894 – 1939
 North Borneo (British Colony)	1945 – 1963
 Sabah	1964 –
 Sarawak	1869 –
 Selangor	1881 –
 Trengganu	1910 –

Maldive Islands
 Maldive Islands	1906 –

Mali Republic
 Mali	1960 –

Malta
 Malta	1860 –
 Sovereign Military Order of Malta  1966 –

Marshall Islands
 Marshall Islands (Marshall Inseln)(German Colony)	1897 – 1916
 Marshall Islands	1984 –
 US post in the Trust Territory of the Pacific Islands	1946 - 1984

Mauritania
 Mauritania	1960 –

Mauritius
 Mauritius	1847 –

Mexico
 Mexico	1856 –
 Campeche	1876 only
 Chiapas	1866 only
 Chihuahua	1872 only
 Cuautla	1867 only
 Cuernavaca	1867 only
 Guadalajara	1867 – 1868
 Mérida	1916 only
 Sinaloa	1929 only
 Tlacotalpan	1856 only
 Yucatán	1924 only

Micronesia, Federated States of
 Caroline Islands (Karolinen) (German colony)	1899 – 1914
 US post in the Trust Territory of the Pacific Islands	1946 – 1984
 Federated States of Micronesia	1984 –

Moldova
 Moldova	1991 –

Monaco
 Monaco	1885 –

Mongolia
 Mongolia	1924 –

Montenegro
 Montenegro	1874 – 1918; 2006 –

Morocco
 Morocco	1956  –
 Northern Zone, Morocco	1956 – 1958
 Sherifian Post	1912 – 1919
 Southern Zone, Morocco	1956 – 1958

Mozambique
 Mozambique	1876 –

Mozambique Territories
 Inhambane	1895 – 1920
 Kionga	1916 only
 Lourenco Marques	1895 – 1921
 Quelimane	1913 – 1920
 Tete	1913 – 1920
 Zambezia	1894 – 1917

Myanmar
 Burma

Nagorno–Karabakh
 Nagorno-Karabakh	1993  –

Namibia
 German South-West Africa	1888 – 1915
 South West Africa	1923 – 1991
 Namibia	1990 –

Natal
 Natal	1857 – 1909

Nauru
 Nauru	1916 –

Nepal
 Nepal	1881 –

Netherlands (kingdom of the Netherlands)
 Netherlands (territory in Europe)	1852 –
 Aruba	1986 –
 Caribbean Netherlands	2010-
 Curaçao	1873 – 1948, 2010-
 Netherlands Antilles	1949 – 2010
 Netherlands Indies	1864 – 1948
 Netherlands New Guinea	1950 – 1962
 Sint Maarten	2010-
 Western New Guinea	1962 – 1963

New Zealand
 New Zealand	1855 –
New Zealand Territories
 King Edward VII Land *	1908 only
 Victoria Land *	1911 – 1912
 Ross Dependency 1957 – 1987, 1994 –
 Niue 1902 – 
 Tokelau 1948 –

* British claims with postal services formally assigned to the New Zealand Post Office

Nicaragua
 Nicaragua	1862 –
 Cabo Gracias a Dios, Nicaragua	1904 – 1909
 Zelaya, Nicaragua	1904 – 1912

Niger
 Niger	1959 –

Nigeria
 Nigeria	1914 –

Nigerian Territories
 Biafra	1968 – 1969
 Lagos	1874 – 1906
 Niger Coast Protectorate	1892 – 1902
 Northern Nigeria	1900 – 1914
 Oil Rivers Protectorate	1892 – 1893
 Southern Cameroons	1960 – 1961
 Southern Nigeria	1901 – 1914

Niuafo'ou
 Niuafo'ou	1983 –

Niue
 Niue	1902 –

Norfolk Island
 Norfolk Island	1947 –

Northern Cyprus

North Korea

North Macedonia
 Macedonia

Norway
 Norway	1855 –

Obock
 Obock (French Colony)	1893–1902
See Djibouti

Oman
 Muscat	1944 – 1948
 Muscat and Oman	1966 – 1970
 Oman	1971 –

Orange River Colony
 Orange Free State	1868 – 1900
 Orange River Colony	1900 – 1907

Pakistan
 Amb State
 Bahawalpur	1945 – 1949
 Las Bela State
 Pakistan	1947 –

Palau
 Caroline Islands (Karolinen) (German colony)	1899 – 1914
 Palau	1983 –
 US post in the Trust Territory of the Pacific Islands	1946 - 1983

Palestine
 Ottoman Post Offices
 Foreign Post Offices
 Palestine (British Mandate) 1917–1948
 Palestinian National Authority 1994–

Panama
 Panama	1878 –

Papua New Guinea
 British New Guinea	1901 – 1906
 New Britain	1914 – 1915
 New Guinea (Australian Administration)	1925 – 1942
 North West Pacific Islands	1915 – 1925
 Papua	1906 – 1942
 Papua New Guinea	1952 –

Paraguay
 Paraguay	1870 –

Penrhyn
 Penrhyn

Peru
 Peru	1858 –

Philippines
 Philippines	1946 –

Pitcairn Islands
 Pitcairn Islands	1940 –

Plebiscite Issues
 Allenstein	1920 only
 Carinthia	1920 only
 East Silesia	1920 only
 Marienwerder	1920 only
 Slesvig	1920 only
 Upper Silesia	1920 – 1922

Poland
 Poland	1918 –
 Poland (Russian Province)	1860 – 1863

Polish Post Abroad
 Central Lithuania (Polish Occupation)	1920 – 1922
 Constantinople (Polish Post Office)	1919 – 1921
 Danzig (Polish Post Office)	1924 – 1939
 Polish Army in Russia	1942 only
 Polish Corps in Russia	1918 only
 Polish Government in Exile	1941 – 1945

Portugal
 Portugal	1853 –

Portuguese Colonies
 Africa (Portuguese Colonies)	1898 only
 Mozambique Company	1892 – 1942
 Nyassa	1897 – 1929
 Portuguese Congo	1894 – 1920
 Portuguese Guinea	1881 – 1974
 Portuguese India	1871 – 1961
 Timor	1885 – 1976

Qatar
 Qatar	1957 –

Ras Al Khaimah
 Ras Al Khaima	1964 – 1966
See United Arab Emirates

Rhineland Palatinate
 Rhineland-Palatinate (German Allied Occupation French Zone)	1947–1949
See Germany

Rhodesia
 British South Africa Company	1890 – 1924
 Northern Rhodesia	1925 – 1964
 Nyasa-Rhodesia Force (NF)	1916 only
 Rhodesia	1965 – 1980
 Rhodesia (British Colonial Issues)	1909 – 1924
 Rhodesia and Nyasaland	1954 – 1964
 Southern Rhodesia	1924 – 1964
 Zambia	1964 –
 Zimbabwe	1980 –

Romania
 Turkish Post Offices
 Foreign Post Offices
 Moldavia	1858 – 1862
 Moldo-Wallachia	1862 – 1865
 Romania	1865 –
 Bessarabia 1941-1945
 Bucovyna 1941-1945
 Transnistria 1941-1945

Romanian Post Abroad
 Banat Bacska (Romanian Occupation)	1919 – 1920
 Constantinople (Romanian Post Office)	1896 – 1919
 Debrecen (Romanian Occupation)	1919 – 1920
 Hungary (Romanian Occupation)	1919 – 1920
 Romanian Post Offices in the Turkish Empire	1896 – 1919
 Temesvar (Romanian Occupation)	1919 only
 Transylvania (Romanian Occupation)	1919 only

Russia
 Russia	1992 –
 Russia (pre-Soviet)	1858 – 1923
 Turkish Post Offices (Batum)
 British Occupation (Batum)

Russian Civil War Issues
 Amur Province	1920 only
 Ataman Semyonov Regime	1920 only
 Crimea	1918 – 1919
 Denikin Government	1919 – 1920
 Don Territory	1918 – 1920
 Far Eastern Republic	1920 – 1922
 Kolchak Government	1919 – 1920
 Kuban Territory	1918 – 1920
 North Ingermanland	1920 only
 North Western Army	1919 – 1920
 Northern Army	1919 – 1920
 Priamur and Maritime Provinces	1921 – 1922
 Siberia (Czechoslovak Army)	1919 – 1920
 Transbaikal Province	1920 only
 Western Army	1919 – 1920
 Wrangel Government	1920 – 1921

Russian Post Abroad
 Russian post offices abroad
 Beirut (Russian Post Office)	1879 – 1910
 China (Russian Post Offices)	1899 – 1920
 Constantinople (Russian Post Office)	1909 – 1910
 Crete (Russian Post Offices)	1899 only
 Dardanelles (Russian Post Office)	1909 – 1910
 Jaffa (Russian Post Office)	1909 – 1910
 Jerusalem (Russian Post Office)	1909 – 1910
 Kerrasunde (Russian Post Office)	1909 – 1910
 Mount Athos (Russian Post Office)	1909 – 1914
 Mytilene (Russian Post Office)	1909 – 1914
 North Korea (Russian Occupation)	1946 – 1948
 Rizeh (Russian Post Office)	1909 – 1910
 Russian post offices in the Turkish Empire	1863 – 1914
 Salonika (Russian Post Office)	1909 – 1914
 Smyrne (Russian Post Office)	1909 – 1910
 South Lithuania (Russian Occupation)	1919 only
 Trebizonde (Russian Post Office)	1909 – 1910

Rwanda

Saar
 Saargebiet, Sarre (Plebiscite)	1920 – 1935
 Saar (Allied Occupation)	1947 – 1957
 Saar (German Federal Republic state)	1957 – 1959
See Germany

Sahrawi Arab Democratic Republic

Saint Kitts and Nevis

Saint Lucia

Saint Pierre and Miquelon 

 Saint Pierre and Miquelon	1885 –

Saint Vincent and the Grenadines

Samaliland Republic of

Samoa
 Samoa	1982 –
 Samoa (Kingdom)	1877 – 1900
 Samoa (New Zealand Administration)	1914 – 1935
 Samoa I Sisifo	1958 – 1982
 Western Samoa	1935 – 1958

San Marino
 San Marino	1877 –

Sao Tome e Principe
 Sao Tome e Principe	1870 –

Saudi Arabia
 Turkish Post Offices
 Foreign Post Offices
 Hejaz	1916 – 1926
 Hejaz-Nejd	1926 – 1932
 Nejd	1925 – 1926
 Saudi Arabia	1932 –

Sedang
 Sedang	1888 – 1890

Senegal
 Senegal	1960 –

Serbia
 Turkish Post Offices
 Foreign Post Offices
 Serbia (Kingdom of)	1866 – 1920
 Kingdom of Serbs, Croats and Slovenes	1921 - 
 Yugoslavia	1944 – 2002
 Serbia and Montenegro	2003 – 2006
 Serbia (Republic of)	2006 –

Serbian Post Abroad
 Baranya (Serbian Occupation)	1919 only
 Hungary (Serbian Occupation)	1919 only
 Temesvar (Serbian Occupation)	1919 only

Seychelles
 British Indian Ocean Territory	1868 – 1976
 Seychelles	1890 –
 Zil Eloigne Sesel 1980 – 1982 
 Zil Elwagne Sesel 1982 – 1984 
 Zil Elwannyen Sesel 1985 – 1992

Sharjah
 Sharjah  1963 – 1972
See United Arab Emirates

Sierra Leone
 Sierra Leone	1859 –

Singapore
 Malaya (British Military Administration)	1945 – 1948
 Malaysia	1963 – 1965
 Singapore	1965 -
 Singapore, Malaya	1948 – 1959
 Singapore, State of	1959 - 1963
 Straits Settlements	1867 – 1942

Slovakia
 Slovakia	1993 –
 Slovakia (Autonomous State)	1939 – 1945

Slovenia
 Slovenia	1991 –
 Slovenia (Provincial Issues)	1919 – 1921

Solomon Islands
 British Solomon Islands	1907 – 1975
 Solomon Islands	1975 –

Somalia
 Somalia 1950 –
 British Somaliland
 British Somaliland 1903 only
 Somaliland Protectorate 1904 – 1960
 Italian Somaliland
 Benadir 1903 – 1905
Oltre Juba 1925 – 1926

Somaliland

South Africa
 South Africa	1910 –
 South African Homelands
 Bophutatswana	1977 – 1994
 Ciskei	1981 – 1994
 Transkei	1977 – 1994
 Venda	1979 – 1994

South Arabia, Federation of
 Federation of South Arabia 1963 - 1968 
See Yemen

South Georgia and South Sandwich Islands
 South Georgia	1963 – 1980
 South Georgia and the South Sandwich Islands	1980 –

South Korea

South Ossetia

South Sudan
 South Sudan 2011 -

Sovereign Military Order of Malta
 Postage stamps and postal history of Sovereign Military Order of Malta (Italy) 1966

Spain
 Canary Islands	1936 – 1938
 Spain	1850 –

Spanish Colonies
 Cape Juby	1916 – 1950
 Cuba and Puerto Rico	1855 – 1872
 Elobey, Annobón, and Corisco	1903 – 1908
 Fernando Poo	1868 – 1968
 Ifni	1941 – 1969
 La Agüera	1920 – 1924
 Puerto Rico	1873 – 1900
 Río de Oro	1905 – 1924
 Río Muni	1960 – 1968
 Spanish Guinea	1902 – 1960
 Spanish Marianas	1898 – 1899
 Spanish Morocco	1914 – 1956
 Spanish Philippines	1854 – 1898
 Spanish Sahara	1924 – 1975
 Spanish West Africa	1949 – 1951

Spanish Post Abroad
 Andorra (Spanish Offices)	1928 –
 Morocco (Spanish Post Offices)	1903 – 1914
 Tangier (Spanish Post Offices)	1921 – 1957
 Tetuan (Spanish Post Office)	1908 – 1909

Sri Lanka
 Ceylon	1857 – 1972
 Sri Lanka	1972 –

St Helena
 St Helena	1856 –

Sudan
 Sudan	1897 –

Suriname
 Suriname	1873 –

Swaziland
 Swaziland	1933 –
 Swaziland (Provisional Government)	1889 – 1894

Sweden
 Stockholm	1856 – 1862
 Sweden	1855 –

Swiss Cantonal Issues
 Basel	1845 only
 Geneva	1843 – 1850
 Zürich	1843 – 1850

Switzerland
 Switzerland	1849 –

Syria
 Alexandretta
 Turkish Post Offices
 Military occupation issues
 British occupation
 French occupation
 Foreign Post Offices
 Alaouites	1925 – 1930
 Hatay	1938 – 1939
 Ile Rouad	1916 – 1921
 Latakia	1931 – 1937
 Syria	1924 –

Taiwan
 Taiwan	2007 –

Tajikistan
 Tajikistan	1992 –

Tannu Tuva 

 Tuvan People's Republic	1926 – 1936

Tanzania
 Tanzania	1965 –

Thailand
 Malaya (Thai Occupation)	1943 – 1945
 Siam	1883 – 1939
 Siam (Thailand)	1947 – 1950
 Thailand	1940 –

Thrace
 Adrianople (Edirne)	1920 – 1922
 Dedeagatz (Greek Occupation)	1913 only
 Eastern Thrace	1920 – 1922
 Gumultsina	1913 only
 Thrace (Allied Occupation)	1919 – 1920
 Western Thrace	1913 only
 Western Thrace (Greek Occupation)	1920 only

Thuringia
 Thuringia (German Allied Occupation Russian Zone)	1945–1946
See Germany

Tibet
 Tibet	1912 – 1959
 Tibet (Chinese Post Offices)	1911 – 1912

Timor Leste (East Timor)
 Portuguese Timor	1885 – 1976
 Indonesia	1976 - 1999
 Timor Lorosae (UNTAET)	2000 - 2002
 Timor Leste	2002 -

Togo
 Togo	1957 –
 Togo (Anglo – French Occupation)	1914 – 1919

Tokelau
 Tokelau	1948 –

Tonga
 Tonga	1886 –

Transnistria

Transvaal
 Lydenburg	1900 – 1902
 New Republic	1886 – 1888
 Pietersburg	1901 only
 Rustenburg	1900 – 1902
 Schweizer-Renecke	1900 only
 South African Republic	1869 – 1902
 Transvaal	1869 – 1910
 Volksrust	1902 only
 Wolmaransstad	1900 only

Trieste
 Trieste (AMG)	1947 – 1954
 Trieste (Yugoslav Military Government)	1948 – 1954

Trinidad and Tobago

Tristan da Cunha
 Tristan da Cunha	1952 –

Trucial States
 Trucial States	1961 – 1972
See United Arab Emirates

Tunisia
 Tunisia	1888 –

Turkey
 Angora	1920 – 1923
 Turkey 1863 –
 Ottoman Empire issues 1863 – 1923
 Republic issues 1923 –
 Foreign Post Offices in the Turkish Empire
 Turkish Post Offices abroad

Turkmenistan
 Turkmenistan	1992 –

Turks and Caicos Islands
 Caicos Islands	1981 –
 Turks and Caicos Islands	1900 –
 Turks Islands	1867 – 1900

Tuvalu

Uganda
 Uganda	1962 –

Ukraine
 Ukraine	1992 –
 Ukraine (pre-Soviet)	1918 – 1923
 Ukrainian Field Post	1920 only
 West Ukraine	1918 – 1919
 Carpathian Ukraine    1939 only
 Transcarpathian Ukraine 1945 only

Umm Al Qiwain
See United Arab Emirates

United Arab Emirates 
 British postal agencies in Eastern Arabia	1948 - 1964
 Trucial States	1961 – 1972
 Trucial States (Individual Emirates)
 Abu Dhabi	1964 – 1972
 Ajman	1964 – 1967
 Dubai	1963 – 1972
 Fujeira	1964 – 1972
 Ras Al Khaima	1964 – 1966
 Sharjah	1963 – 1968
 Umm Al Qiwain	1964 – 1967
 United Arab Emirates (UAE)	1973 –

United Kingdom
 Alderney	1983 –
 Channel Islands	1948 only
 Great Britain	1840 –
 Great Britain (Regional Issues)	1958 –
 Guernsey	1941 –
 Isle of Man	1973 –
 Jersey	1941 –
 Northern Ireland	1958 –
 Scotland	1958 –
 Wales	1958 –
 Post Offices abroad

United Nations
 United Nations Postal Administration  1951 –

United States
 Confederate States of America	1861 – 1865
 Hawaii	1851 – 1898
 USA	1847 –
 Occupation issues

Uruguay
 Uruguay	1856 –

US Post Abroad
 Guam	1899 – 1901
 Philippines (US Administration)	1899 – 1945
 Shanghai (US Postal Agency)	1919 – 1922
 US Post Offices in Japan	1867 – 1874
 US post in the Trust Territory of the Pacific Islands	1946 - 1984

USSR
 Transcaucasian Federation	1923 – 1924
 Tuva	1926 – 1944
 USSR	1923 – 1992
 USSR Issues for the Far East	1923 only

Uzbekistan
 Uzbekistan	1992 –

Vanuatu
 New Hebrides	1908 – 1980
 Vanuatu	1980 –

Vatican City
 Vatican City	1929 –

Venezia Giulia and Istria
 Istria (Yugoslav Occupation)	1945 only
 Venezia Giulia and Istria (AMG)	1945 – 1947
 Venezia Giulia and Istria (Yugoslav Military Government)	1945 – 1947
 Venezia Giulia and Istria (Yugoslav Occupation)	1945 only

Venezuela
 Venezuela	1859 –

Vietnam

Windward Islands
 Barbados	1852 –
 Grenada	1861 –
 Grenadines of Grenada	1973 –
 Grenadines of St Vincent	1973 –
 St Lucia	1860 –
 St Vincent	1861 –
 Tobago	1879 – 1896
 Trinidad	1851 – 1913
 Trinidad and Tobago	1913 –

Württemberg
 Württemberg (German State)	1851–1924
 Württemberg (German Allied Occupation French Zone)	1947–1949
See Germany

Yemen
 Aden (Colony, State of)	1937 – 1963
 Aden
 Federation of South Arabia 1963 - 1968
 India 1854 - 1937
 Kathiri State of Seiyun	1942 – 1967
 Mahra Sultanate of Qishn and Socotra	1967 only
 North Yemen
 Qu'Aiti State in Hadhramaut	1955 – 1967
 Qu'Aiti State of Shihr and Mukalla	1942 – 1955
 Southern Yemen	1968 – 1971
 Upper Yafa	1967 only
 Yemen Arab Republic	1963 – 1990
 Yemen Arab Republic (Unified)	1990 –
 Yemen (Mutawakelite Kingdom)	1926 – 1970
 Yemen PDR	1971 – 1990

Yugoslavia
 Bosnian Serb Republic	1992 –
 Croatia (Yugoslav Regional Issue)	1945 only
 Montenegro (Yugoslav Regional Issues)	1945 only
 Serbia (Yugoslav Regional Issues)	1944 – 1946
 Serbia and Montenegro	2003 – 2006
 Slovenia (Yugoslav Regional Issues)	1945 – 1946
 Yugoslav Government in Exile	1943 – 1945
 Yugoslavia	1944 –
 Yugoslavia (Democratic Federation)	1944 – 1945
 Yugoslavia (Kingdom)	1929 – 1941

Zambia

Zimbabwe

Zululand
 Zululand	1888 – 1897

See also

 List of entities that have issued postage stamps (A–E)
 List of entities that have issued postage stamps (F–L)

References

Bibliography
 Stanley Gibbons Ltd, Europe and Colonies 1970, Stanley Gibbons Ltd, 1969
 Stanley Gibbons Ltd, various catalogues
 Stuart Rossiter & John Flower, The Stamp Atlas, W H Smith, 1989
 XLCR Stamp Finder and Collector's Dictionary'', Thomas Cliffe Ltd, c.1960

External links
 AskPhil – Glossary of Stamp Collecting Terms
 Encyclopaedia of Postal History

$
$
Issuers

fr:Liste des administrations postales, par pays souverains
it:Stati e amministrazioni postali